IDS may refer to:

Computing
 IBM Informix Dynamic Server, a relational database management system
 Ideographic Description Sequence, describing a Unihan character as a combination of other characters
 Integrated Data Store, one of the first database management systems from the 1960s
 Internet distribution system, a travel industry sales and marketing channel
 Intrusion detection system, detecting unwanted network access
 Intelligent Decision System, a software package for multiple criteria decision analysis

Organizations
 Incomes Data Services, a British employment research organisation
 Institute of Development Studies, a British international development organisation
 International Distributions Services, a legal name of Royal Mail since 3 October 2022
 Boeing Integrated Defense Systems, former name of a Boeing Defense, Space & Security
 Integrated Defence Staff, an Indian military organisation
 Investors Diversified Services, former name of Ameriprise Financial
 Istrian Democratic Assembly, a Croatian political party
 Indiana Daily Student, a newspaper
 Raytheon Integrated Defense Systems
 International Dermoscopy Society, an international medical academic society
 International Design School, an Indonesian educational institution
 Initiative for Democratic Socialism
 Institute for the German Language

Science, technology and engineering
 Iduronate-2-sulfatase, a sulfatase enzyme associated with Hunter syndrome
 Index Catalogue of Visual Double Stars
 Integrated Deepwater System Program, a program to upgrade equipment of the US Coast Guard
 Tornado IDS (Interdictor/strike), a version of the Panavia Tornado combat aircraft

Other uses
 Iain Duncan Smith (born 1954), British politician, widely referred to by his initials
 IDS Center, building in Minneapolis, tallest in Minnesota, US
 Infant-directed speech or baby talk
 Information disclosure statement, to the US Patent and Trademark Office
 Integrated delivery system, a generic term for a health care network that provides a variety of care
 Income declaration scheme
 Intercontinental Dictionary Series, an online linguistic database
 International District/Chinatown station, a light rail station in Seattle, Washington, US

See also
 International Docking System Standard (IDSS), a proposed international standard for spacecraft docking